Crispa is a Philippine brand of shirts.

Background
Crispa was established in 1948 as a textile store by the spouses Pablo Floro and Crisanta Lorenzo. The name is a portmanteau of the couple's first names and was later also used for the Floros' clothing and cement businesses. The Floros expanded into textile and shirt manufacturing during the 1950s. 

The brand gained a good reputation by the 1970s with its line of T-shirts, coinciding with the success of its fabled basketball team, the Crispa Redmanizers. The basketball team was established in 1956 by Valeriano "Danny" Floro, one of the sons of the Floro couple. 

The original Crispa shirts and underwear were made purely from cotton and underwent a mechanical process called Redmanization to make the cloth dimensionally stable and more resilient to unwanted shrinking after washing. Crispa's garment and textile products were marketed as "Redmanized", "shrunk-to-fit". Crispa would discontinue its manufacturing and retail businesses, as well as disband its basketball team, following the decline of the Floro business enterprises by the late-1980s. 

During the mid-2000s, the Crispa brand was briefly revived by Star Textiles, Inc. with a line of shirts similar to the original line.

In 2020, VNF and Sons, Inc. revived the Crispa brand with the introduction of a new line of T-shirts.

See also
 Crispa Redmanizers
 Crispa 400

References

Further reading
 Searching for the elusive Crispa store - Hey Ednan! - December 15, 2007

Clothing brands of the Philippines
Products introduced in 1948
1948 establishments in the Philippines